Alan, Allan, or Allen Wilson may refer to:

Sports
 Alan Wilson (cricketer, born 1920) (1920–2015), English cricketer
 Alan Wilson (cricketer, born 1936), former English cricketer
 Alan Wilson (Australian rules footballer) (born 1939), Australian rules footballer for Fitzroy
 Allan Wilson (Australian footballer) (1916–1984), Australian rules footballer for North Melbourne
 Allan Wilson (footballer, born 1945), Scottish former professional footballer
 Alan Wilson (cricketer, born 1942), former English cricketer
 Alan Wilson (motorsport) (born 1946), American race track designer
 Alan Wilson (rugby league) (born 1967), Australian rugby league player
 Allen Wilson (American football) (born 1951/2), American high school football coach
 Allan Wilson (ice hockey) (1894–1940), Canadian ice hockey player
 Allan J. Wilson (1886–1963), Canadian-born American horse racing executive

Politicians
 Alan Wilson (South Carolina politician) (born 1973), Attorney General of South Carolina
 Allan Wilson (Scottish politician) (born 1954), Labour Member of the Scottish Parliament

Musicians
 Alan Wilson (musician) (1943–1970), also known as Alan "Blind Owl" Wilson, American blues singer, lead singer of the group Canned Heat
 Alan Wilson (composer) (born 1947), composer of church music
 Allan Wilson, musician with !!!

Academics
 Alan Herries Wilson (1906–1995), British mathematician and business executive
 Alan Wilson (academic) (born 1939), British scientist and social scientist, UCL
 Allan Wilson (biologist) (1934–1991), New Zealand evolutionary biologist and molecular anthropologist
 Allen B. Wilson (1824–1888), American inventor of the sewing machine shuttle

Others
 Alan Doric Wilson (1939–2011), American playwright, director and producer
 Alan Wilson (bishop) (born 1955), Bishop of Buckingham
 Allan Wilson (army officer) (1856–1893), British major in the First Matabele War, leader of the Shangani Patrol, and the principal character in the London play: Wilson's Last Stand
 Alan R. Wilson, Canadian novelist and poet
 Alan Wilson (judge) (born 1950), justice of the Supreme Court of Queensland
 Alan Wilson, Irish criminal

See also
 Al Wilson (disambiguation)
 Mark Alan Wilson (1953–2005), American murder victim
 Wilson's Allen (1914–1939), American horse
 Alan N. Willson Jr. (born 1939), American electrical engineer